Ulrich Kons (born 3 February 1955) is a retired German rower who had his best achievements in the eights. In this event he won a gold medal at the 1980 Olympics and a world title in 1977. He also won a world title in the coxed fours in 1982. For his Olympic achievement Kons was awarded the Patriotic Order of Merit in 1980.

Kons was Lieutenant of the East German Navy in 1972.

References

1955 births
Living people
Olympic rowers of East Germany
Rowers at the 1980 Summer Olympics
Olympic gold medalists for East Germany
Olympic medalists in rowing
East German male rowers
World Rowing Championships medalists for East Germany
Medalists at the 1980 Summer Olympics
People from Greifswald
Sportspeople from Mecklenburg-Western Pomerania